Anton Sudesh Peiris Kurukulasooriyage (born February 3, 1985) is a weightlifter from Sri Lanka. Kurukulasooriyage was born in Sandalankawa, Sri Lanka. At the 2010 Commonwealth Games he won a bronze medal in the 62 kg event. Kurukulasooriyage was also selected to be a part of Sri Lanka's 2014 Commonwealth Games team, where he was the flagbearer during the opening ceremony. Later he won a silver medal in the 62 kg event.

See also
List of Sri Lankans by sport

References

External links

1985 births
Living people
People from Kurunegala
Sri Lankan male weightlifters
Commonwealth Games bronze medallists for Sri Lanka
Weightlifters at the 2010 Commonwealth Games
Weightlifters at the 2006 Commonwealth Games
Commonwealth Games silver medallists for Sri Lanka
Weightlifters at the 2014 Commonwealth Games
Weightlifters at the 2016 Summer Olympics
Olympic weightlifters of Sri Lanka
Commonwealth Games medallists in weightlifting
South Asian Games gold medalists for Sri Lanka
South Asian Games medalists in weightlifting
Medallists at the 2010 Commonwealth Games
Medallists at the 2014 Commonwealth Games